Tapinoma wroughtonii is a species of ant in the genus Tapinoma. Described by Forel in 1904, the species is endemic to Italy, North Korea and South Korea.

References

Tapinoma
Hymenoptera of Asia
Hymenoptera of Europe
Insects described in 1904